List of rivers in Ceará (Brazilian State).

The list is arranged by drainage basin from east to west, with respective tributaries indented under each larger stream's name and ordered from downstream to upstream. All rivers in Ceará drain to the Atlantic Ocean.

By Drainage Basin 

 Jaguaribe River
 Palhano River
 Banabuiú River
 Sitiá River
 Quixeramobim River
 Boa Viagem River
 Figueiredo River
 Sangue River
 Salgado River
 Porcos River
 Jardim River
 Truçu River
 Cariús River
 Conceição River
 Jucá River
 Pirangi River
 Choró River
 Pacoti River
 Cangati River
 São Gonçalo River
 Curu River
 Caxitoré River
 Canindé River
 Seriema River
 Trairi River
 Mundaú River
 Cruxati River
 Aracatiaçu River
 Pajé River
 Aracatimirim River
 Acaraú River
 Contendas River
 Jacurutu River
 Jaibaras River
 Groaíras River
 Cunhãmati River
 Macacos River
 Jatobá River
 Feitosa River
 Jurema River
 Tucunduba River
 Coreaú River
 Itacolomi River
 Timonha River
 Ubatuba River
 Parnaíba River (Piauí)
 Poti River
 Macambira River (Inhuçu River)

Alphabetically 

 Acaraú River
 Aracatiaçu River
 Aracatimirim River
 Banabuiú River
 Boa Viagem River
 Cangati River
 Canindé River
 Cariús River
 Caxitoré River
 Choró River
 Conceição River
 Contendas River
 Coreaú River
 Cruxati River
 Cunhãmati River
 Curu River
 Feitosa River
 Figueiredo River
 Groaíras River
 Itacolomi River
 Jacurutu River
 Jaguaribe River
 Jaibaras River
 Jardim River
 Jatobá River
 Jucá River
 Jurema River
 Macacos River
 Macambira River (Inhuçu River)
 Mundaú River
 Pacoti River
 Pajé River
 Palhano River
 Pirangi River
 Porcos River
 Poti River
 Quixeramobim River
 Salgado River
 Sangue River
 São Gonçalo River
 Seriema River
 Sitiá River
 Timonha River
 Trairi River
 Truçu River
 Tucunduba River
 Ubatuba River

References
 Map from Ministry of Transport
  GEOnet Names Server

 
Ceara
Environment of Ceará